Aline Rotter-Focken ( Focken; born 10 May 1991) is a German freestyle wrestler. She won the world title in the 69 kg division in 2014 and a bronze medal in the 67 kg category at the 2013 European Championships. At the 2020 Summer Olympics in Tokyo she won the Gold.

She started wrestling in 1996 under the guidance of her father, Hans-Georg Focken.

In 2020, she won the gold medal in the women's 76 kg event at the 2020 Individual Wrestling World Cup held in Belgrade, Serbia. In 2021, she won the gold medal in her event at the 2021 Poland Open held in Warsaw, Poland.
She took gold at the 2020 Summer Olympics in Tokyo.

Match results

! colspan="10"| World Championships & Olympics & Ranking Games
|-
!  Res.
!  Record
!  Opponent
!  Head-to-Head
!  Round
!  Score
!  Note
!  Date
!  Event
!  Location
!  Video
|-
! style=background:white colspan=9 |
|-style="font-size:88%"
|Win
|
|align=left| Yasemin Adar
|1-4
|Gold medal
|2-1
|Win by fall
|December 16, 2020
|rowspan=3|2020 Individual Wrestling World Cup
|style="text-align:left;font-size:88%;" rowspan=3| Belgrade, Serbia
|
|-
|-style="font-size:88%"
|Win
|
|align=left| Aiperi Medet Kyzy
|1-0
|Semifinal
|6-4
|
|rowspan=2|December 15, 2020
|
|-
|-style="font-size:88%"
|Win
|
|align=left| Ekaterina Bukina
|2-0
|Quarterfinal
|10-0
|Win by Superiority
|
|-
! style=background:white colspan=9 |
|-style="font-size:88%"
|Win
|
|align=left| Denise LECARPENTIER
|1-0
|Bronze medal
|10-0
|Win by Superiority
|February 13, 2020
|rowspan=3|European Championship 2020
|style="text-align:left;font-size:88%;" rowspan=3| Rome, Italy
|
|-style="font-size:88%"
|Win
|
|align=left| Kamila Czeslawa KULWICKA
|1-0
|Repechage
|10-0
|Win by Superiority
|style="font-size:88%" rowspan=2|February 12, 2020
|
|-style="font-size:88%"
|Loss
|
|align=left| Yasemin Adar
|1-4
|Round of 8
|4-5
|
|
|-
! style=background:white colspan=9 |
|-style="font-size:88%"
|Win
|
|align=left| Vasilisa Marzaliuk
|1-1
|Bronze medal
|4-2
|
|rowspan=4|January 16, 2020
|rowspan=4|Matteo Pellicone 2020
|style="text-align:left;font-size:88%;" rowspan=4| Rome, Italy
|
|-style="font-size:88%"
|Win
|
|align=left| Andrimar Daniela LAZARO DIAZ
|1-0
|Repechage
|10-0
|Win by Superiority
|
|-style="font-size:88%"
|Loss
|
|align=left| Erica Elizabeth Wiebe
|0-5
|Quarerfinals
|0-3
|
|
|-style="font-size:88%"
|Win
|
|align=left| Alla Belinska
|4-0
|Round of 8
|5-2
|
|

|-
! style=background:white colspan=9 |
|-style="font-size:88%"
|Win
|
|align=left| Elmira Syzdykova
|2-0
|Bronze medal
|3-0
|
|September 19, 2019
|rowspan=5|2019 World Wrestling Championships
|style="text-align:left;font-size:88%;" rowspan=5| Nur-Sultan, Kazakhstan
|
|-style="font-size:88%"
|Loss
|
|align=left| Adeline Gray
|0-1
|Semifinals
|2-5
|
|style="font-size:88%" rowspan=4|September 18, 2019
|
|-style="font-size:88%"
|Win
|
|align=left| Alla Belinska
|4-0
|Quarerfinals
|5-1
|
|
|-style="font-size:88%"
|Win
|
|align=left| Sabira Aliyeva
|1-0
|Round of 16
|10-0
|Win by Superiority
|
|-style="font-size:88%"
|Win
|
|align=left| Kiran Bishnoi
|1-0
|Round of 32
|5-4
|
|
|-
! style=background:white colspan=9 |
|-style="font-size:88%"
|Loss
|
|align=left| Yasemin Adar
|1-4
|Bronze medal
|3-10
|
|July 14, 2019
|rowspan=4|Yasar Dogu 2019
|style="text-align:left;font-size:88%;" rowspan=4| Istanbul, Italy
|
|-style="font-size:88%"
|Loss
|
|align=left| Erica Elizabeth Wiebe
|0-5
|Semifinal
|0-3
|
|rowspan=3|July 13, 2019
|
|-style="font-size:88%"
|Win
|
|align=left| Elmira Syzdykova
|2-0
|Quarterfinal
|2-1
|
|
|-style="font-size:88%"
|Win
|
|align=left| Gulmaral Yerkebayeva
|2-0
|Round of 8
|11-0
|Win by Superiority
|
|-
! style=background:white colspan=10 |
|-
|Win
|
|align=left| Iselin Maria Moen SOLHEIM
|1-0
|style="font-size:88%"|Bronze medal
|style="font-size:88%"|8-0
|style="font-size:88%"|
|style="font-size:88%" rowspan=4|May 24, 2019
|style="font-size:88%" rowspan=4|24th International Tournament, City of Sassari
|style="text-align:left;font-size:88%;" rowspan=4| Sassari, Italy
|style="font-size:88%"|
|-
|Loss
|
|align=left| Erica Elizabeth Wiebe
|0-5
|style="font-size:88%"|Semifinal
|style="font-size:88%"|3-2
|style="font-size:88%"|
|style="font-size:88%"|
|-
|Win
|
|align=left| Gulmaral Yerkebayeva
|2-0
|style="font-size:88%"|Quarterfinal
|style="font-size:88%"|5-4
|style="font-size:88%"|
|style="font-size:88%"|
|-
|Win
|
|align=left| Aline Da Silva Ferreira
|1-0
|style="font-size:88%"|Round of 8
|style="font-size:88%"|4-3
|style="font-size:88%"|
|style="font-size:88%" rowspan=1|
|-
! style=background:white colspan=9 |
|-style="font-size:88%"
|Win
|
|align=left| Kamilė Gaučaitė
|1-0
|Bronze medal
|6-0
|Win by fall
|April 11, 2019
|rowspan=5|2019 European Wrestling Championships
|style="text-align:left;font-size:88%;" rowspan=5| Bucharest, Romania
|
|-style="font-size:88%"
|Loss
|
|align=left| Yasemin Adar
|1-4
|Semifinal
|5-2
| 
|rowspan=4|April 10, 2019
| 
|-style="font-size:88%"
|Win
|
|align=left| Epp Mäe
|1-1
|Quarterfinal
|8-4
|
|
|-
|Win
|
|align=left| Alla Belinska
|4-0
|style="font-size:88%"|Round of 8
|style="font-size:88%"|6-0
|style="font-size:88%"|
|
|-
|Win
|
|align=left| Enrica Rinaldi
|1-0
|style="font-size:88%"| Qualification
|style="font-size:88%"| 11-0
|style="font-size:88%"|
|
|-
! style=background:white colspan=9 |
|-
|Win
|
|align=left| Juan Wang
|1-0
|style="font-size:88%"|Bronze medal
|style="font-size:88%"|7-2
|style="font-size:88%"| 
|style="font-size:88%" rowspan=1|March 2, 2019
|style="font-size:88%" rowspan=4|2019 Dan Kolov - Nikola Petrov Tournament
|style="text-align:left;font-size:88%;" rowspan=4| Sofia, Bulgaria
|
|-
|Loss
|
|align=left| Yasemin Adar
|1-4
|style="font-size:88%"|Semifinal
|style="font-size:88%"|6-5
|style="font-size:88%"| Win by fall
|style="font-size:88%" rowspan=3|March 1, 2019
| 
|-
|Win
|
|align=left| Alla Belinska
|4-0
|style="font-size:88%"|Quarterfinal
|style="font-size:88%"|12-1
|style="font-size:88%"|
|
|-
|Win
|
|align=left| Boryana Tsvetkova Borisova
|2-0
|style="font-size:88%"|Round of 8
|style="font-size:88%"|10-0
|style="font-size:88%"|
|
|-
! style=background:white colspan=9 |
|-
|Win
|
|align=left| Mabelkis Capote Perez
|1-0
|style="font-size:88%"|Bronze medal
|style="font-size:88%"|4-0
|style="font-size:88%"| Win By Fall
|style="font-size:88%" rowspan=1|January 27, 2019
|style="font-size:88%" rowspan=4|Grand Prix Ivan Yariguin 2019
|style="text-align:left;font-size:88%;" rowspan=4| Krasnoyarsk, Russia
|
|-
|Loss
|
|align=left| Vasilisa Marzaliuk
|1-1
|style="font-size:88%"|Semifinal
|style="font-size:88%"|5-5
|style="font-size:88%"| 
|style="font-size:88%" rowspan=3|January 26, 2019
| 
|-
|Win
|
|align=left| Naranchimeg Gelegjamts
|1-0
|style="font-size:88%"|Quarterfinal
|style="font-size:88%"|10-3
|style="font-size:88%"|
|
|-
|Win
|
|align=left| Kseniia Burakova
|1-0
|style="font-size:88%"|Round of 8
|style="font-size:88%"|7-0
|style="font-size:88%"|
|
|-
! style=background:white colspan=10 |
|-
|Lose
|
|align=left| Erica Elizabeth Wiebe
|0-5
|style="font-size:88%"|Quarterfinal
|style="font-size:88%"|4-6
|style="font-size:88%"|
|style="font-size:88%" rowspan=3|24 October 2019
|style="font-size:88%" rowspan=3|2018 World Wrestling Championships
|style="text-align:left;font-size:88%;" rowspan=3| Budapest, Hungary
|style="font-size:88%"| 
|-
|Win
|
|align=left| Cynthia Vescan
|1-0
|style="font-size:88%"|Round of 16
|style="font-size:88%"|4-0
|style="font-size:88%"|
|style="font-size:88%"| 
|-
|Win
|
|align=left| Anastasia Shustova
|2-0
|style="font-size:88%"|Round of 32
|style="font-size:88%"|12-0
|style="font-size:88%"|
|style="font-size:88%"| 
|-
! style=background:white colspan=9 |
|-
|Loss
|
|align=left| Erica Elizabeth Wiebe
|0-5
|style="font-size:88%"|Gold medal
|style="font-size:88%"|0-7
|style="font-size:88%"| 
|style="font-size:88%" rowspan=1|September 9, 2018
|style="font-size:88%" rowspan=3|Poland Open 2018
|style="text-align:left;font-size:88%;" rowspan=3| Warsaw, Poland
|
|-
|Win
|
|align=left| Paliha Paliha
|1-0
|style="font-size:88%"|Semifinal
|style="font-size:88%"|8-0
|style="font-size:88%"| Win by fall
|style="font-size:88%" rowspan=2|September 8, 2019
| 
|-
|Win
|
|align=left| Anastasiia Shustova
|2-0
|style="font-size:88%"|Quarterfinal 
|style="font-size:88%"|8-0
|style="font-size:88%"| Win by fall
|
|-
! style=background:white colspan=9 |
|-
|Win
|
|align=left| Ekaterina Bukina
|style="font-size:88%"| 2-0
|style="font-size:88%"|Gold medal
|style="font-size:88%"|10-0
|style="font-size:88%"|Win by Superiority
|style="font-size:88%" rowspan=1|March 24, 2018
|style="font-size:88%" rowspan=4|2018 Dan Kolov - Nikola Petrov Tournament
|style="text-align:left;font-size:88%;" rowspan=4| Sofia, Bulgaria
|
|-
|Win
|
|align=left| Svetlana Saenko 
|style="font-size:88%"|1-0
|style="font-size:88%"|Semifinal
|style="font-size:88%"|3-0
|style="font-size:88%"| Win by fall
|style="font-size:88%" rowspan=2|March 23, 2018
| 
|-
|Win
|
|align=left| Anna Urbanowicz
|style="font-size:88%"|4-0
|style="font-size:88%"|Quarterfinal
|style="font-size:88%"|10-0
|style="font-size:88%"|Win by Superiority
|
|-
! style=background:white colspan=10 |
|-
|Lose
|
|align=left| Epp Mäe
|1-1
|style="font-size:88%"|Quarterfinal
|style="font-size:88%"|2-6
|style="font-size:88%"|
|style="font-size:88%" rowspan=2|16 February 2018
|style="font-size:88%" rowspan=2|Klippan Lady Open 2018
|style="text-align:left;font-size:88%;" rowspan=2| Klippan, Sweden
|style="font-size:88%"| 
|-
|Win
|
|align=left| Leah Mariem Lorraine Ferguson
|1-0
|style="font-size:88%"|Qualification
|style="font-size:88%"|11-1
|style="font-size:88%"| (4:43)
|style="font-size:88%"| 
|-
! style=background:white colspan=9 |
|-style="font-size:88%"
|Loss
|
|align=left| Sara Dosho
|0-1
|Gold medal
|0-3
|
|August, 2017
|rowspan=5|2017 World Wrestling Championships
|style="text-align:left;font-size:88%;" rowspan=5| Paris, France
|

References

External links
 
 
 
  

1991 births
Living people
German female sport wrestlers
Olympic wrestlers of Germany
Olympic medalists in wrestling
Olympic gold medalists for Germany
Wrestlers at the 2016 Summer Olympics
Wrestlers at the 2020 Summer Olympics
Medalists at the 2020 Summer Olympics
European Games medalists in wrestling
European Games bronze medalists for Germany
Wrestlers at the 2015 European Games
World Wrestling Championships medalists
European Wrestling Championships medalists
Sportspeople from Krefeld
21st-century German women